Caroline Garcia was  the defending champion but lost in the second round to Kateřina Siniaková.

Aryna Sabalenka won the title, defeating Anett Kontaveit in the final, 6–3, 6–3.

Seeds
The top eight seeds received a bye into the second round.

Draw

Finals

Top half

Section 1

Section 2

Bottom half

Section 3

Section 4

Qualifying

Seeds

Qualifiers

Lucky losers

Draw

First qualifier

Second qualifier

Third qualifier

Fourth qualifier

Fifth qualifier

Sixth qualifier

Seventh qualifier

Eighth qualifier

External links 
 Main draw
 Qualifying draw

Singles